Como Esquecer is a 2010 Brazilian film.

Plot 
Júlia (Ana Paula Arósio) is a professor of English literature who is abandoned by her girlfriend after a relationship that lasted over ten years. Because of the separation, Júlia moves to Rio de Janeiro and lives with her best friend, Hugo (Murilo Rosa), who is gay, and Lisa (Natália Lage). In the new work, Júlia ends up attracting the interest a student, and of Helena (Arieta Corrêa), a woman she meets by chance and who is after the teacher, although she does not feel prepared for a new relationship.

Cast 
Ana Paula Arósio as Júlia
Murilo Rosa as Hugo
Natália Lage as Lisa
Arieta Corrêa as Helena
Bianca Comparato as Carmem Lygia
Pierre Baitelli as Nani
Regina Sampaio as Selma
Marília Medina as Tutty
Gillray Coutinho as Honorio
Analu Prestes as Donna Laura
Ana Kutner as Mônica
 Ana Baird as Joana
Lia Racy as Gina
Miriam Juvino as Claudia

References

External links

2010 films
Brazilian drama films
2010s Portuguese-language films
Brazilian LGBT-related films
2010 LGBT-related films
LGBT-related drama films
2010 drama films